Neopaschia nigromarginata is a species of snout moth in the genus Neopaschia. It was described by Viette in 1953, and is known from Madagascar (including Fianarantsoa, the type location).

References

Moths described in 1953
Epipaschiinae
Moths of Madagascar
Moths of Africa